La Piloto is an American crime drama television series created by W Studios and produced by Lemon Films Studios for Univision and Televisa. It is an original story based on real-life events, and began airing on American broadcast channel Univision on 7 March 2017. The series tells the departures of Yolanda Cadena (Livia Brito) and all her efforts to become an airplane pilot.

On June 29, 2017, producer Billy Rovzar confirmed that the series would be renewed for a second season to be released in 2018.

Series overview

Episodes

Season 1 (2017)

Season 2 (2018)

Webisodes

El celular de La Piloto (2017)

References 

Lists of American drama television series episodes
Lists of Mexican drama television series episodes
Lists of soap opera episodes